Incerti is an Italian surname. Notable people with the surname include:

Anna Incerti (born 1980), Italian long-distance runner
Stefano Incerti (born 1965), Italian film director
Zac Incerti (born 1996), Australian swimmer

Italian-language surnames